Yalankul (Yalankül) is a rural locality (a village) in Udryakbashevsky Selsoviet, Blagovarsky District, Bashkortostan, Russia. The population was 43 as of 2010. There is 1 street.

Geography 
Yalankul is located 30 km southwest of Yazykovo (the district's administrative centre) by road. Kullekul is the nearest rural locality.

References 

Rural localities in Blagovarsky District